Juan García Ruiz, O.A.D. (1728–1796) was a Roman Catholic prelate who served as Bishop of Nueva Segovia (1784–1796).

Biography
On 25 Jun 1784, he was appointed during the papacy of Pope Pius VI as Bishop of Nueva Segovia.
On 12 Mar 1786, he was consecrated bishop by Juan Antonio Gallego y Orbigo, Bishop of Nueva Caceres. 
He served as Bishop of Nueva Segovia until his death on 2 May 1796.

References 

18th-century Roman Catholic bishops in the Philippines
Bishops appointed by Pope Pius VI
1728 births
1796 deaths
People from Cebu
Discalced Augustinian bishops
Roman Catholic bishops of Nueva Segovia